Montgomery Blair High School (MBHS) is a public high school in Four Corners, Maryland, United States, operated by Montgomery County Public Schools. Its enrollment of 3,600 makes it the largest school in Montgomery County and in the state.

The school is named for Montgomery Blair, a lawyer who represented Dred Scott in his Supreme Court case and later served as Postmaster General under President Abraham Lincoln. Opened in 1925 as Takoma Park–Silver Spring High School, the school changed its name in 1935 when it moved to 313 Wayne Avenue overlooking Sligo Creek in Silver Spring. In 1998, the school moved two miles (3 km) north to the Kay Tract, a long-vacant site just north of the Capital Beltway.

About 20% of the student body is part of one of two magnet programs: the Science, Math, and Computer Science Magnet, and the Communication Arts Program (CAP), which draw students from the Silver Spring area and across Montgomery County. The school is a member of the National Consortium for Specialized Secondary Schools of Mathematics, Science and Technology (NCSSSMST).

The school sat in the Silver Spring census-designated place until the Four Corners CDP was created after the 2010 U.S. Census.

History

Philadelphia–Chicago campus era (1925–1935)

The school opened in 1925 as Takoma–Silver Spring High School with 86 students. The  campus sat at the corner of Philadelphia Avenue and Chicago Avenue in suburban Takoma Park, Maryland. 

By the end of the 1920s, the school had added a  junior high school (8th and 9th grades) to its senior high school (10th through 12th grades). Growing along with the communities of Silver Spring and Takoma Park, it eventually encompassed kindergarten to 12th grade. By 1934, the school was over-capacity with 450 students, and so, in 1935, the 10th, 11th, and 12 grades moved to a new high school named Montgomery Blair Senior High School. For a time, students, teachers, and administrators commuted between the two campuses. The annual yearbook, Silverlogue, was created around this time.

Wayne Avenue campus era (1935–1998)
When Montgomery Blair High School's  Wayne Avenue campus opened in March 1935, it was the sixth high school in Montgomery County, and the first in the lower county.  One of several Montgomery County schools designed during that period by Howard Wright Cutler, the facility then consisted only of the C building, overlooking Sligo Creek. In 1936, the Auxiliary Gymnasium was added, followed by the B building in 1940, and the D building in 1942. MBHS's first football team was founded in 1944, and the War Memorial Stadium opened in 1947. In 1950, the A building was constructed, containing the Blair Library/Media Center. With the addition of the Main Gymnasium/Fieldhouse in 1954, MBHS possessed one of the finest basketball and football facilities in the county. The E building was added in 1959 as an administrative section, followed by the 1969 opening of the 1200-seat auditorium, named for long-time teacher and librarian Elizabeth Stickley. The most recent addition was the automotive shop building in 1973.

During World War II, students from the University of Maryland taught several classes, and in some cases, able senior students taught sophomore classes. The Blair Library created the "Senior Corner" to honor those who died in war. Life magazine featured the school's Victory Corps close order drill team. Before to the Supreme Court decision in Brown v. Board of Education, Blair was an all-white school. In 1955, the school began to integrate along with the rest of Montgomery County.

With Silver Spring's growth, Blair's enrollment jumped from 600 students in 1946, to 1900 by 1956, peaking at 2900 in 1965 before being reduced from 1700 to 1400 after re-zoning in 1982. Enrollment was around 1,800 when the Science, Mathematics, and Computer Science Magnet program brought 80 new students in the fall of 1985. The Communication Arts Program (CAP) followed in 1987, founded by Alicia Coleman, brought 75 new students. Overcrowding became an issue for Montgomery Blair High School, as portable buildings covered what was once open land and enrollment exceeded the building's capacity of 2,000. In 1994, it was decided that the school should move to an empty tract of land  to the north. Construction began on the Kay Tract in the mid-nineties and the Four Corners campus opened in the fall of 1998. After the move, Blair's Wayne Avenue campus was converted into an elementary and middle school; currently Sligo Creek Elementary School and Silver Spring International Middle School each take up half the campus. The Elizabeth Stickley Auditorium was not included in the conversion plans, and has remained closed and deteriorating since 1997. Several local politicians and leaders, including former Maryland state senator Ida Ruben, current U.S. representative Jamie Raskin and former U.S. Senator Barbara Mikulski, have endorsed projects to restore the auditorium to its former condition.

Four Corners campus era (1998–present)

Montgomery Blair High School remained at the Wayne Avenue campus for over six decades until its 1998 move to the current Four Corners campus at the intersection of University Boulevard, Colesville Road, and the Capital Beltway. When it opened, the new facilities were the largest in the county, spanning a  region, which was nearly twice as large as the old Wayne Avenue site. During the early to mid-2000s, the school population spiked to 3,400 students, rivaling that of some community colleges. Although enrollment has since receded to about 2,900 students, the school still has the largest student population in the county. 2008 brough interactive digital Promethean boardsto many classrooms.

Notable events
In April 1992, Montgomery Blair High School was the first high school in the nation to initiate and sponsor a display of the NAMES Project AIDS Memorial Quilt. More than 5,000 children, their families, teachers and friends came to see the Quilt.

It has been a popular stop for many politicians because of the school's diversity, strong academic programs, and proximity to the nation's capital. On February 5, 1998, President Bill Clinton and UK Prime Minister Tony Blair stopped at Montgomery Blair High School during a state visit.

On March 7, 2003, United States Secretary of Homeland Security Tom Ridge and Secretary of Education Rod Paige visited Blair.

On June 23, 2005, President George W. Bush visited the school to discuss his plan to partially privatize Social Security. Students were not permitted to attend. Despite the last-minute announcement of the visit, about 400 community members, students and union members showed up to question Bush's proposed policies and the fact that this town hall-style meeting was not open to the general public. The police tried to move the demonstration to a park more than a block away, but protesters pointed out that there was no reason they couldn't continue their peaceful protest on the public sidewalk outside the fence around the school.

During the 2010–2011 school year, NBA Hall of Famer Kareem Abdul-Jabbar spoke to a packed auditorium of students about his upcoming film and his life. Abdul-Jabbar then spoke privately with both the varsity and junior varsity basketball teams before posing for photos and signing a few autographs.

On June 1, 2016, Secretary of State John Kerry visited Blair to discuss ocean conservation.

On February 26, 2018, U.S. Congressmen Jamie Raskin and Ted Deutch brought survivors of the Stoneman Douglas High School shooting to Blair to meet with Blair students.

Campus

The current campus of Montgomery Blair High School covers 42 acres between the Capital Beltway, U.S. Route 29, and Maryland Route 193 in Silver Spring's Four Corners neighborhood. The school contains  of space and was originally designed for 2,830 students. Eight years after its completion, the school was more than 500 students over capacity, with a population of about 3,400. At one point, the school had eight auxiliary portable classrooms. Enrollment decreased slightly due to the opening of other schools and the creation of the Downcounty Consortium. Two portables were removed at the beginning of the 2006–2007 school year,and all were gone by April 2010, when enrollment was 2,788. Blair remains the county's largest school.

The school has baseball and softball fields to the east of the main building as well as Blazer Stadium which serves as the home of the school's football, soccer, field hockey, and lacrosse teams. There are three courtyards located throughout the main building. A greenhouse and accompanying patio is located on the second floor on the west side of the main building for the use of horticulture classes. The school building contains a 750-seat auditorium.  The main hallway of the school, 'Blair Boulevard" displays flags from many countries, representing its extremely diverse student body.

In the school year of 2017–2018, Montgomery County Public School's Department of Facilities Management added four new portables to the school's campus, due to the large spike in enrollment. In 2022, Blair is expected to undergo construction for a new gym, a larger Student Activity Center and 18 new classrooms.

Academics
In 2021, MBHS was ranked 49th within Maryland and 2269th nationally by U.S. News & World Report. The school has an Honors Program and an Advanced Placement Program. The school is one of the few US high schools to have a .edu domain name, with its internet connection having gone live in the late 1980s. MBHS is home to two separately-run student news publications: Silver Chips is the school's print newspaper that is self-funded, and Silver Chips Online is an exclusively online publication which received the National Scholastic Press Association Online Pacemaker Award in 2004, 2005 and 2006. The editors-in-chief of Silver Chips for the 2020-2021 school year are Oliver Goldman, Tony González, Renata Muñoz, and Anika Seth. Blair is also home to Silver Quill, a literary arts magazine. Silver Quill is distributed with the school yearbook at the end of the school year.

Science, Mathematics, and Computer Science Magnet program
In 1985, Montgomery County Public Schools opened its first Science, Mathematics, and Computer Science Magnet program at Blair. At the time, Blair had the highest minority population among the high schools in the county and the lowest standardized test scores. The school board conducted a survey to decide that a specialized science magnet program would attract high-achieving white and Asian students to Blair. Although there was criticism of the program from some parents and students, the leaders of the PTA and the principal supported the program, noting that by 1989 more families were staying in the neighborhood to attend Blair and fewer students were seeking to transfer out. In 1993, the Superintendent of Montgomery County Public Schools told the New York Times: "I have never seen a high school's image turn around so quickly."

Since its inception, the Magnet has offered accelerated, interdisciplinary courses in science, mathematics, and computer science. The Magnet offers dozens of electives, including Quantum Physics, Complex Analysis, Thermodynamics, Discrete Mathematics, Marine Biology, 3D Computer Graphics, Artificial Intelligence, Origins of Science, and Organic Chemistry as of 2022. Qualified students who are not in the program can and do enroll in its elective courses. In their senior year, Magnet students complete research projects to enter into the Science Talent Search, in which the program has a long history of success. In 2017, the Magnet had a mean SAT score of 1531 and a mean composite ACT score of 35, both of which are higher than any high school in the nation overall.

The Blair Magnet is open to students from the southern and eastern areas of Montgomery County, who are selected through a competitive application and testing process (a program at Poolesville High School provides a similar curriculum for students in the northern and western areas of the county).

The Magnet program has been criticized for being overwhelmingly white and Asian, enrolling few black and Hispanic students. The Magnet was threatened with proposed budget cuts in 2008, but after student protests, it was spared from the most severe cuts. In 2018, a retired Magnet teacher was accused of sexual harassment by many former students.

Communication Arts Program
The Communication Arts Program (CAP) at was established at Blair soon after the Magnet, in 1988. It strives to provide a comprehensive educational approach to the humanities by offering accelerated, interdisciplinary courses in English, social studies, and media for participating students. CAP is open to students in the Downcounty Consortium and admission is competitive by application and testing.

CAP offers courses in drama, photography, video production, history, government, English literature, writing composition, journalism and research. The number of CAP classes decreases by year, until students only complete one CAP class in 12th grade. The curriculum frequently builds off of existing Advanced Placement courses but uses the program's resources to add interdisciplinary experiences, such as a simulated presidential election that occurs over the course of a week at end of 10th grade, in which some students serve as candidates and others as campaign staff and reporters. CAP students also maintain portfolios of their work throughout the four years, which must include independent and service-based projects done outside of school. In 12th grade, they must successfully defend the portfolio's contents to a faculty committee in order to complete the program and graduate with a CAP Diploma.

English Department
In addition to offering standard English courses, the English Department also offers AP courses in Language and Literature, as well as studies in dramatics, journalism, and theater.

Fine Arts Department
The Fine Arts Department consists of two sub-departments of Music and Visual Arts. The Music Department includes instrumental music, choral music, and general music. Each year the department hosts a fine arts festival, in which students showcase their artistic talent.

Instrumental Music Department
MBHS's Instrumental Music Department consists of three orchestras, three bands, and two jazz bands: Chamber Orchestra (Honors), Symphonic Orchestra, and Concert Orchestra; and Wind Ensemble (Honors), Symphonic Band, and Concert Band. The jazz ensembles are Advanced Jazz Ensemble (Honors), and Jazz Lab Band. In addition, the music program also contains a marching band and a theatrical pit orchestra, as well as an audio library and a professional recording studio.

In the Spring of 2014, MBHS's Chamber Orchestra hosted British Composer Paul Lewis as a Composer-in-Residence, receiving pay from the Wolftrap Foundation. Students played the world premiere of a 5 movement long piece called "Salute the Silents".

Choral Music Department
The Choral Music Department consists of Chorus, Show Choir, Chamber Choir (Honors), a Cabaret, and InToneNation, an a cappella group.

General Music Department
The General Music Department offers studies in music history, technology, business, composition, and theory. There are also courses offered in solo and ensemble techniques for piano and guitar playing.

Visual Arts Department
MBHS's Visual Arts Department offers studies in art & culture, ceramics & sculpture, digital art, photography, and studio art.

Foreign Language Department
The Foreign Language Department offers classes up to AP-level in Spanish, French, and Latin, and up to honors-level in Japanese and Arabic. It has recently added American Sign Language (ASL), which offer classes up to ASL 3.

Mathematics Department
The Mathematics Department offers a variety of honors- and AP-level courses, including: Algebra 1, Geometry, Algebra II, Precalculus, Calculus, Statistics, and Business Mathematics.

Science Department
The Science Department contains sub-departments in the core sciences of Physics, Chemistry, Biology, and Earth Science.

Social Studies Department
MBHS's Social Studies Department offers honors and AP-level U.S. History, American Government and Politics, and World History, the department also offers elective courses such as African American History, Latin American History, European History, Middle East History, Comparative Government, Comparative religion, Cultural Anthropology, Administration of Justice, International Human Rights, Peace Studies Seminar, Economics, and Psychology. It was also the first in the region to offer courses in Women's Studies and the History of Hip-Hop.

Athletics
The student athletics program currently offers 23 different varsity and 8 junior varsity sports, with a total of 42 teams:

Fall
Football*
Girls Field Hockey*
Boys Soccer*
Girls Soccer*
Girls Volleyball*
Golf
Cross Country*
Handball
Girls Tennis
Poms
Cheerleading

Winter
Boys Basketball*
Girls Basketball*
Swimming and Diving
Ice Hockey^
Wrestling
Indoor Track
Cheerleading

Spring
Boys Baseball*
Girls Softball*
Boys Lacrosse*
Girls Lacrosse*
Track and Field
Boys Volleyball
Co-ed Volleyball
Boys Tennis
Gymnastics

Year-round
Badminton^
Ultimate Frisbee^
Rowing^

 * indicates a sport for which there is also a junior varsity team.
 ^ indicates a sport that is not officially sanctioned by the school and is thus considered a club team.

Student activities and traditions
MBHS has over 95 teams or clubs, some of which are entirely student-run, including the Blair Radio Station, "Blazer Pride" Marching Band, Debate Team, and Jewish Culture Club and Philosophy Club.
Popular activities include: Knowledge Master Open, American Computer Science League, Envirothon, Science Bowl, Ocean Science Bowl, Doodle4Google, and Youth and Government.

Computer team
Montgomery Blair's computer team specializes in advanced computer science topics and programming algorithms which extend the classroom curriculum. Upperclassmen students teach new and complex algorithms, data structures, and programming techniques, including Dijkstra's shortest-path algorithm, dynamic programming, and greedy algorithms. The team also delves into other miscellaneous theoretical computer science topics including turing machines, nondeterministic polynomial time, random number generation, assembly language, lambda calculus, and relational databases. The Computer Team won the ACSL All-Star Competition Senior Division in 1991, 1993, 2001, 2003, 2009, 2011 and 2013.

Robotics team
MBHS has an active FIRST Robotics Competition team, Team 449, nicknamed "The Blair Robot Project", inspired from the film The Blair Witch Project. The team was founded in 2000, and has competed in every year since except 2005.

Puzzlepalooza
MBHS has a puzzle tournament known as Puzzlepalooza. Puzzlepalooza has been self-proclaimed as "America's premier high school puzzle tournament." The tournament first began in 2010 and had taken place each May until 2020, when the tournament was canceled due to the Covid-19 pandemic. The tournament resumed for May 2022 after a two year hiatus. During a four-day period, teams have 12 hours to complete multiple-leveled puzzles. This puzzles produce a phrase that will be used in the final puzzle, which is the main goal of Puzzlepalooza. Completing this final puzzle results in prizes for the team that solves it. There are also many other prizes available for the teams such as the Spirit Award or the Iron Puzzler Award.

Science bowl
MBHS has an active science bowl team, consistently doing well in the Maryland Science Bowl and winning the National Science Bowl in 1999 and 2016. Blair won the National Ocean Sciences Bowl in 2018.

Quiz bowl
MBHS has an active quiz bowl team that competes in the local It's Academic competition. Blair won the It's Academic Super Bowl in 1995, 2017, and 2018.

BlackCAP 
Established in 2016, BlackCAP is a student-run movement dedicated to helping students of color be accepted to and achieve in Montgomery County Public School application programs. BlackCAP was spearheaded by Alix Swann, Jaya Hinton, and Marley Majette (Class of 2018) and is sponsored by Mr. Kenneth Smith. BlackCAP has several components including a safe space for students of color in magnet programs and mentoring programs at Parkland Middle School and Silver Spring International Middle School.

History bowl 
The Montgomery Blair History Bowl team won the 2020 National History Bowl Junior Varsity Championship. with team members Martin Brandenburg, Albert Ho, Jason Liu, and Leela Mehta-Harwitz.

Notable alumni
Blair has had many notable alumni in public service, the entertainment industry, sports, media, business, and academics.

Politics and public service
Tyras S. Athey, former member of the Maryland House of Delegates and Secretary of State of Maryland.
William A. Bronrott, former member of the Maryland House of Delegates.
Robin Ficker, former member of the Maryland House of Delegates.
Stan Greenberg, Democratic Party pollster and political strategist, known for his work on Bill Clinton’s Presidential campaign.
Thomas R. Norris, U.S. Navy SEAL who received the Medal of Honor for his actions during the Vietnam War.
William Addams Reitwiesner, genealogist and Library of Congress employee.
Craig L. Rice, Montgomery County Councilmember and former member of the Maryland House of Delegates.

Arts and entertainment
Cynthia Addai-Robinson, actress appearing in TV series Arrow, Spartacus, and Shooter.
Tyrone Giordano, film and stage actor, known for his lead role in Big River.
Eric Glover, writer for TV series Tom Swift and author of graphic novel Black Star.
Goldie Hawn, Oscar-winning actress in Hollywood movies including Cactus Flower, Private Benjamin, and The First Wives Club.
Ron Holloway, jazz saxophonist.
Eric Hutchinson, singer-songwriter known for his songs "Rock & Roll" and "Watching You Watch Him".
Rosamond S. King, poet and literary theorist.
Joshua Oppenheimer (finished high school in New Mexico), filmmaker of Oscar-nominated films The Act of Killing and The Look of Silence.
Chuck Redd, jazz percussionist.
Nora Roberts, bestselling romance novelist.
Sylvester Stallone, American actor, screenwriter, and film director (attended for short time before moving to Philadelphia).
Ben Stein, economist, actor, commentator, speech writer for U.S. President Richard Nixon.
Rebecca Sugar (traveled to Albert Einstein High School for Visual Art Center Program), artist, composer, and director, created the Cartoon Network series Steven Universe.
 Lisa Ann Walter, actress and comedian, known for her roles in The Parent Trap and Abbott Elementary.

Sports and games
Steve Barber, baseball player for the Baltimore Orioles.
Tom Brown, baseball player for the Washington Senators and football player for the Green Bay Packers.
Dominique Dawes (finished high school in Gaithersburg), Olympic gymnast.
Steve Francis (completed GED), basketball player for the Maryland Terrapins and Houston Rockets.
Kelli Hill, coach of USA Women's Gymnastics Teams.
Wei-Hwa Huang, four-time World Puzzle Champion.
Sonny Jackson, baseball player for the Houston Colt .45's/Houston Astros and Atlanta Braves; the first black athlete at Blair.
Johnny Klippstein, baseball player for the Chicago Cubs, Minnesota Twins, and several other Major League Baseball teams, including the 1959 World Series champion Los Angeles Dodgers.
Jake Rozhansky, American-Israeli soccer player for Maryland Terrapins and Israel's Liga Leumit.
Visanthe Shiancoe, football player for the Minnesota Vikings.
Charlene Thomas-Swinson, college basketball player (Auburn) and coach (LSU).
Willis Wilson, former head men's basketball coach at Rice University.
Bob Windsor, football player for the San Francisco 49ers and New England Patriots.
David Vanterpool, basketball player for the Washington Wizards and assistant coach for Portland Trail Blazers.
Morgan Wootten, high school basketball coach for DeMatha.

Journalism and media
Erik Agard, crossword puzzle editor for USA Today.
Carl Bernstein, journalist and author known for breaking the Watergate scandal for The Washington Post.
Kiran Chetry, journalist and television news anchor for Fox News and CNN.
Connie Chung, journalist and television news anchor, known for co-hosting CBS Evening News.
Emily Gould, author and former co-editor of Gawker.
Rick Leventhal, broadcast journalist, Former Senior Correspondent for Fox News Channel.
Tom Marr, former Baltimore Orioles radio broadcaster, longtime radio talk show host on Baltimore's WCBM(680-AM).
Donna Richardson, fitness and aerobics instructor, author and ESPN commentator.
Eric Shansby, cartoonist for The Washington Post.
Daniel Zwerdling, journalist for NPR.

Business
Matias Duarte, Google Vice-President of Design.
Shervin Pishevar, entrepreneur and venture capitalist, known for co-founding Hyperoffice and Hyperloop One.
Chris T. Sullivan, co-founder of Outback Steakhouse.
Patrick Y. Lee, co-founder and CEO of Rotten Tomatoes.

Academics
Maneesh Agrawala, Professor of Computer Science at Stanford, Winner of 2009 MacArthur Fellowship.
Malcolm Beasley, Professor of Applied Physics at Stanford, former President of the American Physical Society.
Alexander Berg, Associate Professor of Computer Science at UC Irvine and computer-vision researcher at Meta AI.
Jonah Berger, bestselling author and marketing professor at the Wharton School of the University of Pennsylvania.
Lorrie Cranor, Professor of Computer Science at Carnegie Mellon University, former Chief Technologist of the Federal Trade Commission.
Samit Dasgupta, Professor of Mathematics at Duke University.
Jacob Lurie, Professor of Mathematics at Harvard University, winner of MacArthur Fellowship and Breakthrough Prize in Mathematics.
Stephen Vladeck, Professor of Law at the University of Texas, expert on the prosecution of war crimes.
Joshua Weitz, Professor of Biology at Georgia Tech, AAAS Fellow.

References

External links

Montgomery Blair High School
Statistics about Montgomery Blair High School

Educational institutions established in 1925
Four Corners, Maryland
Magnet schools in Maryland
NCSSS schools
Public high schools in Montgomery County, Maryland
1925 establishments in Maryland